Tim O'Donnell is an American television director, producer and writer.

He began his career as a writer, writing episodes of Gloria, Diff'rent Strokes, Growing Pains and Just the Ten of Us. He made his directorial debut with the television series Home Free starring Matthew Perry, a series he co-created with Richard Gurman. He has since directed episodes of Dave's World, Clueless, The Amanda Show, Lizzie McGuire, Phil of the Future, Flight 29 Down and the internet series Woke Up Dead. He also created Uncle Buck, which lasted one season. In 1992, he signed up with a deal at Paramount Television.

References

External links

American television directors
American television producers
American television writers
American male television writers
Living people
Place of birth missing (living people)
Year of birth missing (living people)